Zielnowo  (formerly German Zielnitz or Sellen) is a village in the administrative district of Gmina Darłowo, within Sławno County, West Pomeranian Voivodeship, in north-western Poland.

For the history of the region, see History of Pomerania.

Zielnowo has a population of 71. Politician Andrzej Lepper owned a farm in the village.

References

Zielnowo